Psachna is a small Greek town in Euboea, 16 km north of Chalcis. It is built in a small plain in the central-west part of the island. Psachna is the seat of Dirfys-Messapia municipality and the seat of Messapia regional unit. The town is also known for the Psachna campus of National and Kapodistrian University of Athens and the football team Iraklis Psachna. Its population is 5,827 residents according to 2011 census.

History
The settlement of Psachna was built by refugees after the sack of Chalcis in 1470 during the First Ottoman–Venetian War. During the Ottoman occupation, it was a small village with few houses. After Greek independence, refugees from Samos were installed in Psachna, leading to the naming of a district of Psachna as "Samiotika". The population of Psachna was increased in the last century when residents of the more mountainous villages such as Pyxaria, Vavoula, Apogremno moved in. In August 2020, the town and the region was badly hit from catastrophic floods that resulted in 6 deaths.

Historical population

Description
The National and Kapodistrian University of Athens has a campus in Psachna. There are three monasteries near Psachna: Saint John Kalyvitis, Panagia Makrymallis and Panagia Gorgoepikoos. The first two were built during the Byzantine period, destroyed later and rebuilt. The third monastery was built after 1960.

Psachna has also the best medical facilities in the area.

References

Populated places in Euboea